Barnes Creek may refer to:
Barnes Creek (Bear Creek tributary), a stream in Missouri
Barnes Creek (Uwharrie River tributary), a stream in North Carolina
Barnes Creek (Washington)
Barnes Creek (Wisconsin)